Shanna Marie Leonard Young (born February 20, 1991) is an American mixed martial artist who competes in the Bantamweight division. She has previously competed in the Ultimate Fighting Championship.

Background
Young, following her younger brother, started Shotokan karate at the age of eight and after a few years switched to competitive karate in which she competed until high school. She started wrestling while attending Franklin County High School and after faring well solely against boys she took a wrestling scholarship at King University where she was an All-American in 2010. She later transferred to East Tennessee State University from where she graduated with bachelor's degree in exercise science.

Mixed martial arts career

Early career and Invicta FC

After three relatively comfortable victories, Young took a hard-fought split decision over Pam Sorenson. After her win over Pam, she received news that she'd suffered a torn labrum in her hip. After recovering from that injury, she tore the same labrum again. She was out for two years due to these injuries before returning to fight for Invicta FC.

Young was supposed to face Raquel Pa'aluhi in her Invicta FC debut, but Raquel pulled out and was replaced by Lisa Verzosa on September 1, 2018, at  Invicta FC 31: Jandiroba vs. Morandin. She lost the fight via a split decision.

After losing this fight, she fought twice for Valor Fighting Challenge, winning both fights via stoppage before being invited on Dana White's Contender Series to face Sarah Alpar on August 13, 2019. She lost the fight via 2nd round submission.

Afterwards, she returned to Invicta and fought Maiju Suotama on November 1, 2019, at Invicta FC 38: Murata vs. Ducote. She won the fight via unanimous decision.

After Mariya Agapova was forced to pull out of her fight against Daiana Torquato on February 7, 2020, at Invicta FC 39: Frey vs. Cummins II, Shanna Young replaced Mariya but she was not medically cleared after she fell ill the week of weigh ins.

Ultimate Fighting Championship
Young made her UFC debut as a replacement for Nicco Montaño against Macy Chiasson on February 15, 2020, at UFC Fight Night 167. She lost the fight by unanimous decision.

Young faced Stephanie Egger on October 2, 2021, at UFC Fight Night: Santos vs. Walker. She lost the fight via technical knockout in round two.

Young faced Gina Mazany on April 30, 2022, at UFC on ESPN 35. She won the fight via TKO in the second round.

Young was scheduled to face Miranda Maverick on August 20, 2022, at UFC 278. However, the bout was cancelled due to Young was hospitalised due to weight cutting issues. The pair was rescheduled at UFC Fight Night 214. She lost the fight via unanimous decision.

On November 16, 2022, it was announced that Young was no longer on the UFC roster.

Post UFC 
Young faced Sandra Lavado on February 24, 2024 at  PFL Challenger Series 13, winning the bout via unanimous decision.

Personal life
Young has two sons, Chase (born 2010) and Ray (born 2020).

Championships and accomplishments

Mixed martial arts
King of the Cage
Women's Bantamweight Championship (one time; former)
One successful title defense
Invicta Fighting Championships
Fight of the Night (One time)

Mixed martial arts record

|-
|Win
|align=center|9–5
|Sandra Lavado
|Decision (unanimous)
|PFL Challenger Series 13
| 
|align=center|3
|align=center|5:00
|Orlando, Florida, United States
|
|-
|Loss
|align=center|8–5
|Miranda Maverick
|Decision (unanimous)
|UFC Fight Night: Rodriguez vs. Lemos
|
|align=center|3
|align=center|5:00
|Las Vegas, Nevada, United States
|
|-
|Win
|align=center|8–4
|Gina Mazany
|TKO (punches)
|UFC on ESPN: Font vs. Vera 
|
|align=center|2
|align=center|3:11
|Las Vegas, Nevada, United States
|
|-
|Loss
|align=center|7–4
|Stephanie Egger
|TKO (elbow)
| UFC Fight Night: Santos vs. Walker
| 
| align=center|2
| align=center|2:22
| Las Vegas, Nevada, United States
|
|-
| Loss
| align=center|7–3
| Macy Chiasson
|Decision (unanimous)
|UFC Fight Night: Anderson vs. Błachowicz 2 
|
|align=center|3
|align=center|5:00
|Rio Rancho, New Mexico, United States
|
|-
| Win
| align=center|7–2
| Maiju Suotama
|Decision (unanimous)
|Invicta FC 38: Murata vs. Ducote
|
|align=center|3
|align=center|5:00
|Kansas City, Kansas, United States
|
|-
| Loss
| align=center|6–2
| Sarah Alpar
| Submission (rear-naked choke)
| Dana White's Contender Series 24
| 
| align=center| 2
| align=center| 2:55
| Las Vegas, Nevada, United States
|
|-
| Win
| align=center| 6–1
| Anastasia Bruce
| Submission (mounted triangle choke)
|Valor Fighting Challenge 56
|
|align=center|1
|align=center|2:35
|Knoxville, Tennessee, United States
|
|-
| Win
| align=center| 5–1
| Jessica Borga
| Submission (punches)
| Valor Fighting Challenge 54
|
|align=Center|3
|align=center|3:24
|Knoxville, Tennessee, United States
| 
|-
| Loss
| align=center| 4–1
| Lisa Verzosa
| Decision (split)
| Invicta FC 31: Jandiroba vs. Morandin 
| 
| align=center| 3
| align=center| 5:00
| Kansas City, Missouri, United States
| 
|-
| Win
| align=center| 4–0
| Pam Sorenson
| Decision (split)
| KOTC: Generation X
| 
| align=center| 5
| align=center| 5:00
| Carlton, Minnesota, United States
| 
|-
| Win
| align=center| 3–0
| Christina Jobe
| TKO (retirement)
| KOTC: Bear Brawl
| 
| align=center| 3
| align=center| 5:00
| Carlton, Minnesota, United States
| 
|-
| Win
| align=center| 2–0
| Moriel Charneski
| Decision (majority)
| KOTC: Attack Mode
| 
| align=center| 3
| align=center| 5:00
| Lac du Flambeau, Wisconsin, United States
|
|-
| Win
| align=center| 1–0
| Katelyn Dykas
| Submission (rear-naked choke)
| Valor Fights 22
| 
| align=center|3
| align=center|1:53
| Knoxville, Tennessee, United States
|

See also 
 List of female mixed martial artists

References

External links 
  
 

Living people
1991 births
American female mixed martial artists
Bantamweight mixed martial artists
Mixed martial artists utilizing karate
Mixed martial artists utilizing collegiate wrestling
Mixed martial artists utilizing Brazilian jiu-jitsu
Ultimate Fighting Championship female fighters
American female karateka
American female sport wrestlers
Amateur wrestlers
American practitioners of Brazilian jiu-jitsu
Female Brazilian jiu-jitsu practitioners
21st-century American women